Prinomastat (code name AG-3340) is a matrix metalloproteinase (MMP) inhibitor with specific selectivity for MMPs 2, 3, 9, 13, and 14. Investigations have been carried out to determine whether the inhibition of these MMPs is able to block tumour metastasis by preventing MMP degradation of the extracellular matrix proteins and angiogenesis. Prinomastat underwent a Phase III trial to investigate its effectiveness against non-small cell lung cancer (NSCLC), in combination with gemcitabine chemotherapy. However, it was discovered that Prinomastat did not improve the outcome of chemotherapy in advanced non-small-cell lung cancer.

References

Experimental cancer drugs
Hydroxamic acids
Matrix metalloproteinase inhibitors
Sulfonamides
4-Pyridyl compounds